Kenneth F. Harris II is an African American mechanical engineer who works with the NASA Goddard Space Flight Center. Harris' work focuses on protecting satellites from cyberthreats and malicious interference in low-Earth orbit. Over his career, Harris has worked on space security through to next-generation observatories. Harris is also a science communicator.

Early life and education 
Harris grew up in Prince Georges County Maryland. Initially he became interested in engineering as a child after spending time with his father in the office and laboratory.

Harris attended Eleanor Roosevelt High School, graduating in 2010. He has highlighted how two high school teachers, Hubert Willoughby and Troy Bradbury, helped him through his high school experience. In 2014, Harris received a B.S. degree in Mechanical Engineering from the University of Maryland, Baltimore County's College of Engineering after a struggle with course and laboratory work. Harris gives credit to his former engineering professor, Anne Spence, for assisting him. In 2017 he received a master's degree in Engineering Management from Johns Hopkins University Whiting School of Engineering.

Career 

During summer 2007, Harris worked as a janitor, cleaning the school building for incoming students. In 2008, Harris started his career at NASA Goddard Space Flight Center. Since then he has worked on several flight projects including the Magnetospheric Multiscale Mission Satellite studying the effects of radiation on components, the Global Precipitation Measurement Satellite contributing to the deployable solar array hinges, and the Joint Polar Satellite System leading the database team. Harris has said his most memorable mission was serving as the deputy lead integration engineer for the James Webb Space Telescope Integrated Science Instrument Module, which houses the computing and electrical resources for the satellite. Harris led the team to integrate the main payload of the satellite that will detect the light from stars billions of light years away.  The media has portrayed him as a "Face of NASA" saying: "He has worked on five different satellite missions since he started working at NASA at age 16" and he is "one of the youngest African-Americans to lead integration efforts on the telescope."
During the 2020 general election, Harris was elected onto the Board of Education in Prince George's County Maryland.

References

External links 
 

African-American engineers
African-American politicians
1992 births
Living people
People from Prince George's County, Maryland
American engineers
Johns Hopkins University alumni
University of Maryland, Baltimore County alumni